The practice of eating live seafood, such as fish, crab, oysters, baby shrimp, or baby octopus, is widespread. 
Oysters are typically eaten live. The view that oysters are acceptable to eat, even by strict ethical criteria, has notably been propounded in the seminal 1975 text Animal Liberation, by philosopher Peter Singer. However, subsequent editions have reversed this position (advocating against eating oysters). Singer has stated that he has "gone back and forth on this over the years", and as of 2010 states that "while you could give them the benefit of the doubt, you could also say that unless some new evidence of a capacity for pain emerges, the doubt is so slight that there is no good reason for avoiding eating sustainably produced oysters".

Live seafood dishes

Controversy 
Octopuses are eaten alive in several countries around the world, including the United States. Animal welfare groups have objected to this practice on the basis that octopuses can experience pain. In support of this, since September 2010, octopuses being used for scientific purposes in the European Union are protected by EU Directive 2010/63/EU "as there is scientific evidence of their ability to experience pain, suffering, distress and lasting harm." In the United Kingdom, this means that octopuses used for scientific purposes must be killed humanely, according to prescribed methods (known as "Schedule 1 methods of euthanasia").

London resident Louis Cole ran a YouTube channel in which he ate live seafood. The Guardian commented on the ethical issues raised by the behaviour of Coles that: "It seems objectively less cruel to kill a scorpion instantly than to rear chickens in battery cages or pigs in the most miserable pork farms.

Health issues
In India, the government provides support for an annual fish medicine festival in Hyderabad, where asthma patients are given a live sardine to eat which is supposed to cure their asthma.

Infection by the fish tapeworm Diphyllobothrium latum is seen in countries where people eat raw or undercooked fish.

See also

 Eating live animals
 Eating raw fish
 Ethics of eating meat
 Monkey brains (cuisine)
 Odorigui, Japanese term for consumption of live seafood while it is still moving
 Pain in crustaceans
 Pain in fish
 Pain in invertebrates

References

External links
 Macho foodies in New York develop a taste for notoriety The Observer, Sunday 30 May 2010. 
 Foods to Try Before You Die Fox News, 19 October 2009.
 Lobsters and Crabs Feel Pain, Study Shows Discovery News, 27 March 2009.
 Do fish feel pain? HowStuffWorks. Retrieved 27 May 2012.

Cruelty to animals
Seafood dishes
Dishes involving the consumption of live animals